Thomas Amrhein may refer to:

 Tom Amrhein (1911–?), American soccer midfielder
 Thomas Amrhein (bobsleigh) (born 1989), Swiss bobsledder